El Haouaria Airfield is an abandoned military airfield in Tunisia, located approximately 44 km northeast of Tāklisah; about 40 km east of Tunis. It was a temporary airfield constructed by the United States Army Corps of Engineers in 1943 during the Tunisian Campaign.

El Haouaria was used primarily by the United States Army Air Force Ninth Air Force 324th Fighter Group during June through early October 1943, flying P-40 Warhawks. After the 324th left for Menzel Heurr Airfield, the airfield was dismantled and abandoned. Today, only remains of the runway are visible in aerial photography.

References

 Maurer, Maurer. Air Force Combat Units of World War II. Maxwell AFB, Alabama: Office of Air Force History, 1983. 521p..

External links

Airfields of the United States Army Air Forces in Tunisia
World War II airfields in Tunisia
Airports established in 1943